Yvette Monginou (later Trombetta; 16 May 1927 – 16 February 2023) was a French athlete, who specialised in the sprints.

Biography 
Monginou was born in Castres on 16 May 1927. She won five French national titles: three in the 80m hurdles in 1948, 1949 and 1952, one in the 100 m in 1951 and one 200 m in 1953. Selected for 1948 Summer Olympics in London, she competed in the 80m hurdles, placing fourth in the race in the time of 11.8s. During the 1952 Summer Olympics, at Helsinki she reached the semifinals of the 80m hurdles, the 100m quarter finals, and was knocked out in the first round of the 4 × 100 m relay.

Monginou married Charles Trombetta (1924–2016). The couple had four children. She died on 16 February 2023, at the age of 95.

Results

Records

References

External links 
Yvette Trombetta's profile at Sports Reference.com
  

1927 births
2023 deaths
People from Castres
French female sprinters
Olympic athletes of France
Athletes (track and field) at the 1948 Summer Olympics
Athletes (track and field) at the 1952 Summer Olympics
Sportspeople from Tarn (department)
Olympic female sprinters